Chester Griswold (January 14, 1781 – September 7, 1860) was a New York Assemblyman from Nassau, New York, and a member of the political Griswold Family.

Biography
Griswold was born in Bolton, Connecticut, to Simeon Griswold and Ann Hutchinson. Chester was elected to the New York State Legislature in 1823, 1831, and 1835. He was a long-time Postmaster of Nassau.

Chester's son, John Augustus Griswold, served as a member of the U.S. House of Representatives from New York's 15th district.

References

Politicians from Pittsfield, Massachusetts
People from Bolton, Connecticut
Griswold family
1781 births
1860 deaths
19th-century American politicians